KRP Properties (formerly Kanata Research Park Corporation) is a Canadian real estate corporation in Kanata, Ontario, Canada, which leases and develops commercial real estate. It operates the business parks known as Kanata Research Park and Kanata North Technology Park.

The parks are home to many companies, mostly IT-related, such as Mitel, Ericsson, March Networks, Huawei, Hewlett-Packard, Amdocs, DragonWave, Solace, Pleora Technologies, Protecode, TSMC Design Technology Canada, Halogen Software and Nokia.  There are also Ciena and Cisco locations in the area. It is also home to the Brookstreet Hotel and the Marshes Golf Club.

As of 2018, Martin Vandewouw is president of KRP Properties. The supporting management team includes Linda A.Sprung (Director of Leasing), Terry Young (Director of Property Management), Richard Goldstein (Director of Construction), Monique Clayton (Director of Finance) and J.Patrick Ferris (General Counsel and Corporate Secretary).

In 2015, KRP Properties was selected for the Sustainability Award at the 2015 Ottawa Business Awards. They were selected because of their efforts towards integrating energy and waste reduction, water conservation, green cleaning and sustainable purchasing into all aspects of their business operations.

See also
 List of research parks

References

External links
 Official website

High-technology business districts in Canada
Industrial parks in Canada
Business parks of Canada
Real estate companies of Canada
Privately held companies of Canada
Wesley Clover
Companies based in Ottawa
Commercial real estate companies
1986 establishments in Ontario